General John Churchill, 1st Duke of Marlborough, 1st Prince of Mindelheim, 1st Count of Nellenburg, Prince of the Holy Roman Empire,  (26 May 1650 – 16 June 1722 O.S.) was an English soldier and statesman whose career spanned the reigns of five monarchs. From a gentry family, he served first as a page at the court of the House of Stuart under James, Duke of York, through the 1670s and early 1680s, earning military and political advancement through his courage and diplomatic skill.

Churchill's role in defeating the Monmouth Rebellion in 1685 helped secure James on the throne, but he was a key player in the military conspiracy that led to James being deposed during the Glorious Revolution. Rewarded by William III with the title Earl of Marlborough, persistent charges of Jacobitism led to his fall from office and temporary imprisonment in the Tower of London. William recognised his abilities by appointing him as his deputy in Southern Netherlands (modern-day Belgium) before the War of the Spanish Succession in 1701, but not until the accession of Queen Anne in 1702 did he secure his fame and fortune.

Marriage to Sarah Jennings and her relationship with Anne ensured Marlborough's rise, first to the captain-generalcy of British forces, then to a dukedom. As de facto leader of Allied forces in the Low Countries, his victories at Blenheim (1704), Ramillies (1706), Oudenarde (1708), and Malplaquet (1709) ensured his place in history as one of Europe's great generals.

His wife's stormy relationship with the Queen, and her subsequent dismissal from court, was central to his own fall. Incurring Anne's disfavour, and caught between Tory and Whig factions, Marlborough was forced from office and went into self-imposed exile. He returned to favour with the accession of George I to the British throne in 1714, but a stroke in 1716 ended his active career.

Marlborough's leadership of the Allied armies fighting Louis XIV from 1701 to 1710 consolidated Britain's emergence as a front-rank power, while his ability to maintain unity in the fractious coalition demonstrated his diplomatic skills. He is often remembered by military historians as much for his organisational and logistic skills as his tactical abilities. However, he was also instrumental in moving away from the siege warfare that dominated the Nine Years' War, arguing one battle was worth ten sieges.

Early life and career (1650–1678)

Churchill was the second but eldest-surviving son of Sir Winston Churchill (1620–1688) of Glanvilles Wootton, Dorset, and Elizabeth Drake, whose family came from Ash, in Devon. Winston served with the Royalist Army in the Wars of the Three Kingdoms; he was heavily fined for doing so, forcing his family to live at Ash House with his mother-in-law.

Only five of their children survived infancy: Arabella (1648–1730), who was the eldest; followed by John; George (1654–1710); and Charles (1656–1714). Another brother, Theobald, died in 1685.

After the 1660 Restoration of Charles II, Winston became Member of Parliament for Weymouth and from 1662 served as Commissioner for Irish Land Claims in Dublin. On returning to London in 1663, he was knighted and received a position at Whitehall, with John attending St Paul's School.

The family fortune was made in 1665 when Arabella Churchill became maid of honour to Anne Hyde and began an affair with her husband, James, Duke of York. This lasted over a decade; James had four acknowledged children by her, including the Duke of Berwick (1670–1734). Their relationship led to appointments for her brothers; John was appointed page to James, and in September 1667 made an ensign in the Foot Guards.

Claims that Churchill served with the Tangier Garrison cannot be confirmed, but he is recorded as being with Sir Thomas Allin in the Mediterranean from March to November 1670. He returned to London, where in February 1671 he engaged in a duel with Sir John Fenwick. He allegedly had an affair with Barbara Villiers, a mistress of Charles II, and may have fathered her daughter Barbara Fitzroy, although he never formally acknowledged her.

In the 1670 Treaty of Dover, Charles II agreed to support a French attack on the Dutch Republic and supply a British brigade of 6,000 troops for the French army. Louis XIV paid him £230,000 per year for this. When the Franco-Dutch War began in 1672, Churchill was present at the Battle of Solebay on 28 May, possibly aboard James' flagship, the Prince, which was crippled in the action.

Shortly thereafter, Churchill was commissioned Captain in the Duke of York's Admiralty Regiment, part of the British brigade, commanded by the Duke of Monmouth. The alliance with Catholic France was extremely unpopular and many doubted the brigade's reliability against the Protestant Dutch. As a result, it served in the Rhineland against the Holy Roman Empire, although Churchill, Monmouth and other volunteers took part in the French siege of Maastricht.

England withdrew from the war with the 1674 Treaty of Westminster, but to keep his subsidies, Charles encouraged members of the Anglo-Scots force to remain in French service; many did so, including Monmouth and Churchill, who became Colonel of one such regiment, serving under Marshal Turenne. He was present at Sinsheim in June 1674, Enzheim in October, and possibly at Sasbach in July 1675, where Turenne was killed.

Sometime around 1675, Churchill met the 15-year-old Sarah Jennings, who came from a similar background of minor Royalist gentry, ruined by the war. The family moved to London after her father died and in 1673, Sarah and her sister Frances joined the household of Mary of Modena, James' second Catholic wife. Despite opposition from his father, who wanted him to marry the wealthy Catherine Sedley, Churchill married Sarah in the winter of 1677–78, helped by Mary.

The couple had five children who survived to adulthood: Henrietta Churchill, 2nd Duchess of Marlborough (1681–1733), Lady Anne Churchill (1683–1716), John Churchill, Marquess of Blandford (1686–1703), Elizabeth (1687–1714), and Mary (1689–1719).

Early service (1678–1700)

Crisis 
In November 1677, William of Orange married James's eldest daughter, Mary, and in March 1678, the Earl of Danby negotiated an Anglo-Dutch defensive alliance. Churchill was sent to the Hague to make arrangements for an expeditionary force, although English troops did not arrive in significant numbers until after the Peace of Nijmegen ended the war on 10 August.

James publicly confirmed his conversion to Catholicism in 1673 and as heir to the throne, this led to a political crisis that dominated English politics from 1679 to 1681. In the 1679 General Election, Churchill was elected MP for Newtown; the majority supported James' exclusion and he spent the next three years in exile, Churchill acting as his liaison with the court.

Charles defeated the Exclusionists and dismissed Parliament in 1681, allowing James to return to London. In 1682, Churchill was made Lord Churchill of Eyemouth in the peerage of Scotland and the following year, colonel of the King's Own Royal Regiment of Dragoons. These rewards allowed him to live in some style and comfort; in addition to a house in London, he purchased Holywell House, near St Albans. He also gained control of the Parliamentary constituency of St Albans; his brother George held the seat from 1685 to 1708.

Charles Churchill served at the Danish court, where he became friends with Prince George of Denmark, who married James' younger daughter Anne in 1683. His senior aide was Colonel Charles Griffin, brother-in-law to Sarah, appointed Lady of the Bedchamber to Anne. The Churchills and their relatives formed a central part of the so-called 'Cockpit circle' of Anne's friends, named after her apartments in Whitehall. Churchill was reportedly concerned at being too closely associated with James, particularly since Sarah's sister Frances was married to Irish Catholic Richard Talbot, appointed Lord Deputy of Ireland in 1687. This was offset by their connection with the Protestant Anne, while Sarah herself was renowned for being virulently anti-Catholic.

Rebellion

Despite his Catholicism, James succeeded Charles as king in February 1685 with widespread support. Many feared his exclusion would lead to a repetition of the 16381651 Wars of the Three Kingdoms but tolerance for his personal beliefs did not apply to Catholicism in general. His support collapsed when his policies appeared to threaten the primacy of the Church of England and created the very instability his supporters wished to avoid.

This preference for stability led to the rapid defeat in June 1685 of Argyll's Rising in Scotland and the Monmouth Rebellion in western England. In the campaign against Monmouth, Churchill led the infantry, under the command of the Earl of Feversham, at Sedgemoor on 6 July 1685, defeating the rebels and effectively putting an end to the rebellion. Although subordinate to Feversham, Churchill's administrative capacity, tactical skill, and courage in battle were pivotal in the victory.

In recognition of his contribution, he was promoted Major General and given the colonelcy of the Third Troop of Life Guards. In May, he had been made Baron Churchill of Sandridge, giving him a seat in the House of Lords, which led to the first open breach with James; Lord Delamere was accused of involvement in the rebellion and tried by 30 members of the House of Lords, including Churchill. As the most junior peer, he went first and his vote for acquittal was viewed as giving a lead to others; Delamere was set free, much to James' annoyance.

As early as 1682, Churchill was recorded as being uneasy at James' obstinacy. The conviction he was always right often resulted in what many viewed as vindictive behaviour, including Monmouth's clumsy execution and the persecution of his followers by Judge Jeffreys. This provides the immediate context for Delamere's acquittal but shortly after the Coronation, Churchill reputedly told French Protestant Henri de Massue that "If the King should attempt to change our religion, I will instantly quit his service."

Revolution

Churchill emerged from the Sedgemoor campaign with great credit, but he was anxious not to be seen as sympathetic towards the King's growing religious ardour against the Protestant establishment. James II's promotion of Catholics in royal institutions – including the army – engendered first suspicion, and ultimately sedition in his mainly Protestant subjects; even members of his own family expressed alarm at the King's fanatic zeal for the Roman Catholic religion. 

When the queen gave birth to a son, James Francis Edward Stuart, it opened up the prospect of a line of successive Catholic monarchs. Some in the King's service, such as the Earl of Salisbury and the Earl of Melfort, converted to Catholicism and were seen as having betrayed their Protestant upbringing in order to gain favour at court. Churchill remained true to his conscience, telling the King, "I have been bred a Protestant, and intend to live and die in that communion", although he was also motivated by self-interest. Believing that the monarch's policy would either wreck his own career or generate a wider insurrection, he did not intend, like his unfortunate father before him, to be on the losing side.

Seven men met to draft the invitation to the Protestant Dutch Stadtholder, William, Prince of Orange, to invade England and assume the throne. The signatories to the letter included Whigs, Tories, and the Bishop of London, Henry Compton, who assured the Prince that, "Nineteen parts of twenty of the people ... are desirous of change". 

William needed no further encouragement. Although the invitation was not signed by Churchill (he was not, as yet, of sufficient political rank to be a signatory), he declared his intention through William's principal English contact in The Hague – "If you think there is anything else that I ought to doe, you have but to command me".

William landed at Brixham on 5 November 1688 (O.S.); from there, he moved his army to Exeter. James's forces – once again commanded by Lord Feversham – moved to Salisbury, but few of its senior officers were eager to fight – even Princess Anne wrote to William to wish him "good success in this so just an undertaking". Promoted to Lieutenant-General on 7 November (O.S.) Churchill was still at the King's side, but his displaying "the greatest transports of joy imaginable" at the desertion of Lord Cornbury led Feversham to call for his arrest. Churchill himself had openly encouraged defection to the Orangist cause, but James continued to hesitate. Soon it was too late to act. After the meeting of the council of war on the morning of 24 November (O.S.), Churchill, accompanied by some 400 officers and men, slipped from the royal camp and rode towards William in Axminster, leaving behind him a letter of apology and self-justification:
... I hope the great advantage I enjoy under Your Majesty, which I own I would never expect in any other change of government, may reasonably convince Your Majesty and the world that I am actuated by a higher principle ...

When the King saw that he could not keep even Churchill – for so long his loyal and intimate servant – he despaired. James II, who in the words of the Archbishop of Rheims, had "given up three kingdoms for a Mass", fled to France, taking with him his son and heir.

William's general

As part of William III and Mary II's coronation honours, Churchill was created Earl of Marlborough on 9 April 1689 (O.S.); he was also sworn as a member of the Privy Council and made a Gentleman of the King's Bedchamber. His elevation, however, led to accusatory rumours from King James's supporters that Marlborough had disgracefully betrayed his erstwhile king for personal gain; William himself entertained reservations about the man who had deserted James. Marlborough's apologists, including his biographer and most notable descendant Winston Churchill, have been at pains to attribute patriotic, religious, and moral motives to his action; but in the words of David G. Chandler, it is difficult to absolve Marlborough of ruthlessness, ingratitude, intrigue and treachery against a man to whom he owed virtually everything in his life and career to date.

Marlborough's first official act was to assist in the remodelling of the army – the power of confirming or purging officers and men gave the Earl the opportunity to build a new patronage network which would prove beneficial over the next two decades. His task was urgent, for less than six months after James II's departure, England joined the war against France as part of a powerful coalition aimed at curtailing the ambitions of Louis XIV. With his experience it was logical that Marlborough took charge of the 8,000 English troops sent to the Low Countries in the spring of 1689; yet throughout the Nine Years' War (1688–97) he saw only three years service in the field, and then mostly in subordinate commands. However, at the Battle of Walcourt on 25 August 1689 Marlborough won praise from the Allied commander, Prince Waldeck – "... despite his youth he displayed greater military capacity than do most generals after a long series of wars ... He is assuredly one of the most gallant men I know".

Since Walcourt, though, Marlborough's popularity at court had waned. William and Mary distrusted both Lord and Lady Marlborough's influence as confidants and supporters of Princess Anne (whose claim to the throne was stronger than William's). Sarah had supported Anne in a series of court disputes with the joint monarchs, infuriating Mary who included the Earl in her disfavour of his scheming wife. Yet for the moment the clash of tempers were over-shadowed by more pressing events in Ireland where James had landed in March 1689 in an attempt to regain his thrones. When William left for Ireland in June 1690 Marlborough became commander of all troops and militia in England, and was appointed a member of the Council of Nine to advise Mary on military matters in the King's absence; but she made scant effort to disguise her distaste at his appointment – "I can neither trust or esteem him", she wrote to William.

William III's victory at the Battle of the Boyne on 1 July 1690 (O.S.) forced James II to abandon his army and flee back to France. In August Marlborough himself left for Ireland engaged upon his first independent command – a land/sea operation upon the southern ports of Cork and Kinsale. It was a bold, imaginative project aimed at disrupting Jacobite supply routes, and one which the Earl conceived and executed with outstanding success. Cork fell on 27 September (O.S.), and Kinsale followed in mid-October. Although the campaign did not end the war in Ireland as Marlborough hoped, it taught him the significance of the minutiae of logistics, and the importance of cooperation and tact when working alongside other senior Allied commanders. It would, however, be more than ten years before he once again took charge in the field.

Dismissal and disgrace

William III recognised Marlborough's qualities as a soldier and strategist, but the refusal of the Order of the Garter and failure to appoint him Master-General of the Ordnance rankled with the ambitious Earl; nor did Marlborough conceal his bitter disappointment behind his usual bland discretion. Using his influence in Parliament and the army, Marlborough aroused dissatisfaction concerning William's preferences for foreign commanders, an exercise designed to force the King's hand. Aware of this, William in turn began to speak openly of his distrust of Marlborough; the Elector of Brandenburg's envoy to London overheard the King remark that he had been treated – "so infamously by Marlborough that, had he not been King, he would have felt it necessary to challenge him to a duel".

Since January 1691 Marlborough had been in contact with the exiled James II in Saint-Germain, anxious to obtain the erstwhile King's pardon for deserting him in 1688 – a pardon essential for the success of his future career in the not altogether unlikely event of a Jacobite restoration. James himself maintained contact with his supporters in England whose principal object was to re-establish him upon his throne. William was well aware of these contacts (as well as others such as Godolphin and the Duke of Shrewsbury), but their double-dealing was seen more in the nature of an insurance policy, rather than as an explicit commitment. Marlborough did not wish for a Jacobite restoration, but William was conscious of his military and political qualities, and the danger the Earl posed: "William was not prone to fear", wrote Thomas Macaulay, "but if there was anyone on earth that he feared, it was Marlborough".

By the time William and Marlborough had returned from an uneventful campaign in the Spanish Netherlands in October 1691, their relationship had further deteriorated. In January 1692, the Queen, angered by Marlborough's intrigues in Parliament, the army, and even with Saint-Germain, ordered Anne to dismiss Sarah from her household – Anne refused. This personal dispute precipitated Marlborough's dismissal. On 30 January 1692 (20 January 1691 O.S.), the Earl of Nottingham, Secretary of State, ordered Marlborough to dispose of all his posts and offices, both civil and military, and consider himself dismissed from all appointments and forbidden the court. No reasons were given but Marlborough's chief associates were outraged: Shrewsbury voiced his disapproval and Godolphin threatened to retire from government. Admiral Russell, now commander-in-chief of the Navy, personally accused the King of ingratitude to the man who had "set the crown upon his head".

High treason
The nadir of Marlborough's fortunes had not yet been reached. The spring of 1692 brought renewed threats of a French invasion and new accusations of Jacobite treachery. Acting on the testimony of one Robert Young, the Queen had arrested all the signatories to a letter purporting the restoration of James II and the seizure of William III. Marlborough, as one of these signatories, was sent to the Tower of London on 4 May (O.S.) where he languished for five weeks; his anguish compounded by the news of the death of his younger son Charles on 22 May (O.S.). Young's letters were eventually discredited as forgeries and Marlborough was released on 15 June (O.S.), but he continued his correspondence with James, leading to the celebrated incident of the "Camaret Bay letter" of 1694.

For several months the Allies had been planning an attack on Brest, the French port in the West of Brittany. The French had received intelligence alerting them to the imminent assault, enabling Marshal Vauban to strengthen its defences and reinforce the garrison. Inevitably the attack on 18 June led by Thomas Tollemache ended in disaster; most of his men were killed or captured, and Tollemache himself died of his wounds shortly afterwards. Despite lacking evidence, Marlborough's detractors claimed that it was he who had alerted the enemy. Macaulay states that in a letter on 3 May 1694 Marlborough betrayed the Allied plans to James, thus ensuring that the landing failed and that Tollemache, a talented rival, was killed or discredited as a direct result. Historians such as John Paget and C. T. Atkinson conclude that he probably did write the letter, but did so only when he knew that it would be received too late for its information to be of any practical use (the plan of the attack on Brest was widely known, and the French had already begun to strengthen their defences in April). To Richard Holmes, the evidence linking Marlborough with the Camaret Bay letter (which no longer exists), is slender, concluding, "It is very hard to imagine a man as careful as Marlborough, only recently freed from suspicion of treason, writing a letter which would kill him if it fell into the wrong hands". However, David Chandler surmises that, "the whole episode is so obscure and inconclusive that it is still not possible to make a definite ruling. In sum, perhaps we should award Marlborough the benefit of the doubt".

Reconciliation
Mary's death on 28 December 1694 (O.S.) eventually led to a formal but cool reconciliation between William III and Anne, now heir to the throne. Marlborough hoped that the rapprochement would lead to his own return to office, but although he and Lady Marlborough were allowed to return to court, the Earl received no offer of employment.

In 1696 Marlborough, together with Godolphin, Russell and Shrewsbury, was yet again implicated in a treasonous plot with James II, this time instigated by the Jacobite militant John Fenwick. The accusations were eventually dismissed as a fabrication and Fenwick executed – the King himself had remained incredulous – but it was not until 1698, a year after the Treaty of Ryswick brought an end to the Nine Years' War, that the corner was finally turned in William's and Marlborough's relationship. On the recommendation of Lord Sunderland (whose wife was a close friend of Lady Marlborough), William eventually offered Marlborough the post of governor to the Duke of Gloucester, Anne's eldest son; he was also restored to the Privy Council, together with his military rank. When William left for Holland in July, Marlborough was one of the Lords Justices left running the government in his absence; but striving to reconcile his close Tory connections with that of the dutiful royal servant was difficult, leading Marlborough to complain – "The King's coldness to me still continues".

War of the Spanish Succession (1701-1714)

In the late 17th and early 18th centuries, the single most important theme in European politics was the rivalry between the House of Habsburg and the House of Bourbon. In 1665, the infirm and childless Habsburg Charles II became the King of Spain. Spain was no longer the dominant global power it once was but remained a vast global confederation, with possessions in Italy, the Spanish Netherlands, the Philippines and large parts of the Americas. It proved remarkably resilient; when Charles died in 1700, it was largely intact and had even expanded in areas like the Pacific. Its possession could change the balance of power in favour of either France or Austria.

Attempts to partition the Empire between the French and Austrian candidates or install an alternative from the Bavarian Wittelsbach dynasty failed. When Charles died, he left his throne to Louis XIV's grandson who became Philip V of Spain on 16 November 1700. However, this was on condition Philip renounce his claim to the French throne; Louis' decision to ignore this once again threatened French domination over Europe and led to the Grand Alliance being reformed in 1701.

With his health deteriorating, William III appointed Marlborough Ambassador-Extraordinary and commander of English forces to attend the conference at the Hague. On 7 September 1701, the Treaty of the Second Grand Alliance nominated Emperor Leopold I's second son Archduke Charles as King of Spain instead of Phillip. It was signed by England, the Dutch Republic and the Holy Roman Empire represented by Emperor Leopold I, head of the Austrian Habsburgs; however, the increasing independence of German states within the Empire meant Bavaria now allied itself with France.

William III died on 8 March 1702 (O.S.) from injuries sustained in a riding accident and was succeeded by his sister-in-law Anne. While his death was expected, it deprived the Alliance of its most obvious leader although Marlborough's personal position was further strengthened by his close relationship with the new Queen. Anne appointed him Master-General of the Ordnance, a Knight of the Garter and Captain-General of her armies at home and abroad. Lady Marlborough was made Groom of the Stool, Mistress of the Robes and Keeper of the Privy Purse giving them a combined annual income of over £60,000 and unrivalled influence at court.

Early campaigns
On 4 May 1702 (O.S.) England formally declared war on France. Marlborough was given command of the English, Dutch, and hired German forces, but he had not as yet commanded a large army in the field, and had far less experience than a dozen Dutch and German generals who now had to work under him. His command had its limitations, however. As commander of Anglo-Dutch forces he had the power to give orders to Dutch generals only when their troops were in action with his own; at all other times he had to rely on his powers of tact and persuasion, and gain the consent of accompanying Dutch field deputies or political representatives of the States General. The Dutch generals and deputies were concerned by the threat of an invasion from a powerful enemy. Nevertheless, despite his Allies' initial lassitude the campaign in the Low Countries (the war's principal theatre) began well for Marlborough. After outmanoeuvring Marshal Boufflers, he captured Venlo, Roermond, Stevensweert and Liège, for which in December a grateful Queen publicly proclaimed Marlborough a duke.

On 9 February 1703 (O.S.), soon after the Marlboroughs' elevation, their daughter Elizabeth married Scroop Egerton, Earl of Bridgewater. This was followed in the summer by an engagement between Mary and John Montagu, heir to the Earl of, and later Duke of Montagu, (they later married on 20 March 1705 (O.S.)). Their two older daughters were already married: Henrietta to Godolphin's son Francis in April 1698, and Anne to the hot-headed and intemperate Charles Spencer, Earl of Sunderland in 1700. However, Marlborough's hopes of founding a great dynasty of his own reposed in his eldest and only surviving son, John, who, since his father's elevation, had borne the courtesy title of Marquess of Blandford. But while studying at Cambridge in early 1703, the 17-year-old was stricken with a severe strain of smallpox. His parents rushed to be by his side, but on Saturday morning, 20 February (O.S.), the boy died, plunging the duke into "the greatest sorrow in the world".

Bearing his grief, and leaving Sarah to hers, the Duke returned to The Hague at the beginning of March. By now Marshal Villeroi had replaced Boufflers as commander in the Spanish Netherlands, but although Marlborough was able to take Bonn, Huy, and Limbourg in 1703, the "Great Design" – the Anglo-Dutch plan to secure Antwerp and thereby open the river lines into Flanders and Brabant – was left in ruins by Villeroi's initiative, poor Allied co-ordination, and by General Obdam's defeat at the Battle of Eckeren on 30 June. Domestically the Duke also encountered problems. The moderate Tory ministry of Marlborough, the Lord Treasurer Godolphin, and the Speaker of the House of Commons Robert Harley, were hampered by, and often at variance with, their High Tory colleagues whose strategic policy favoured the full employment of the Royal Navy in pursuit of trade advantages and colonial expansion overseas. To the Tories an action at sea was preferable to one ashore: rather than attack the enemy where they were strongest the Tories proposed to attack Louis XIV and Philip V where they were weakest – in their colonial empires and on the high seas. In contrast the Whigs, led by their Junto, enthusiastically supported the Ministry's Continental strategy of thrusting the army into the heart of France. This support wilted somewhat following the Allies' recent campaign, but the Duke, whose diplomatic tact had held together a very discordant Grand Alliance, was now a general of international repute, and the limited success of 1703 was soon eclipsed by the Blenheim campaign.

Blenheim and Ramillies

Pressed by the French and Bavarians to the west and Hungarian rebels to the east, Austria faced the real possibility of being forced out of the war. Concerns over Vienna and the situation in southern Germany convinced Marlborough of the necessity of sending aid to the Danube; but the scheme of seizing the initiative from the enemy was extremely bold. From the start the Duke resolved to mislead the Dutch, who would never willingly permit any major weakening of Allied forces in the Spanish Netherlands. To this end, Marlborough moved his English troops to the Moselle (a plan approved of by The Hague), but once there he planned to slip the Dutch leash and march south to link up with Austrian forces in southern Germany.

A combination of strategic deception and brilliant administration enabled Marlborough to achieve his purpose. After marching  from the Low Countries, the Allies fought a series of engagements against the Franco-Bavarian forces ranged against them on the Danube. The first major encounter occurred on 2 July 1704 when Marlborough and Prince Louis of Baden stormed the Schellenberg heights at Donauwörth. However, the main event followed on 13 August when Marlborough – assisted by the Imperial commander, the able Prince Eugene of Savoy – delivered a crushing defeat on Marshal Tallard's and the Elector of Bavaria's army at the Battle of Blenheim. The whole campaign, which historian John A. Lynn describes as one of the greatest examples of marching and fighting before Napoleon, had been a model of planning, logistics, tactical and operational skill, the successful outcome of which had altered the course of the conflict – Bavaria was knocked out of the war, and Louis XIV's hopes of an early victory were destroyed. With the subsequent fall of Landau on the Rhine, and Trier and Trarbach on the Moselle, Marlborough now stood as the foremost soldier of the age. Even the Tories, who had declared that should he fail they would "break him up like hounds on a hare", could not entirely restrain their patriotic admiration.

The Queen lavished upon her favourite the royal manor of Woodstock and the promise of a fine palace commemorative of his great victory at Blenheim; but since her accession her relationship with Sarah had become progressively distant. The Duke and Duchess had risen to greatness not least because of their intimacy with Anne, but the Duchess's relentless campaign against the Tories (Sarah was a firm Whig) isolated her from the Queen whose natural inclinations lay with the Tories, the staunch supporters of the Church of England. For her part, Anne, now Queen and no longer the timid adolescent so easily dominated by her more beautiful friend, had grown tired of Sarah's tactless political hectoring and increasingly haughty manner which, in the coming years, were to destroy their friendship and undermine the position of her husband.

During the Duke's march to the Danube Emperor Leopold I offered to make Marlborough a prince of the Holy Roman Empire in the small principality of Mindelheim. The Queen enthusiastically agreed to this elevation, but after the successes of 1704, the campaign of 1705 brought little reason for satisfaction on the Continent. The planned invasion of France via the Moselle valley was frustrated by friend and foe alike, forcing the Duke to withdraw back towards the Low Countries. Although Marlborough penetrated the Lines of Brabant at Elixheim in July, Allied indecision and considerable Dutch hesitancy (concerned as they were for the security of their homeland), prevented the Duke from pressing his advantage. The French and the Tories in England dismissed arguments that only Dutch obstructionism had robbed Marlborough of a great victory in 1705, confirmed in their belief that Blenheim had been a chance occurrence and that Marlborough was a general not to be feared.

The early months of 1706 also proved frustrating for the Duke as Louis XIV's generals gained early successes in Italy and Alsace. These setbacks thwarted Marlborough's original plans for the coming campaign, but he soon adjusted his schemes and marched into enemy territory. Louis XIV, equally determined to fight and avenge Blenheim, goaded his commander, Marshal Villeroi, to seek out Monsieur Marlbrouck. The subsequent Battle of Ramillies, fought in the Spanish Netherlands on 23 May, was perhaps Marlborough's most successful action, and one in which he had himself characteristically drawn his sword at the pivotal moment. For the loss of fewer than 3,000 dead and wounded (far fewer than Blenheim), his victory had cost the enemy some 20,000 casualties, inflicting in the words of Marshal Villars, "the most shameful, humiliating and disastrous of routs". The campaign was an unsurpassed operational triumph for the English general. Town after town subsequently fell to the Allies. "It really looks more like a dream than truth", wrote Marlborough to Sarah.

Falling out of favour

While Marlborough fought in the Low Countries, a series of personal and party rivalries instigated a general reversal of fortune. The Whigs, who were the main prop of the war, had been laying siege to Godolphin. As a price for supporting the government in the next parliamentary session, the Whigs demanded a share of public office with the appointment of a leading member of their Junto, the Earl of Sunderland (Marlborough's son-in-law), to the post of Secretary of State. The Queen, who loathed Sunderland and the Junto, and who refused to be dominated by any single party, bitterly opposed the move; but Godolphin, increasingly dependent on Whig support, had little room for manoeuvre. With Sarah's tactless, unsubtle backing, Godolphin relentlessly pressed the Queen to submit to Whig demands. In despair, Anne finally relented and Sunderland received the seals of office; but the special relationship between Godolphin, Sarah, and the Queen had taken a severe blow and she began to turn increasingly to a new favourite – Sarah's cousin, Abigail Masham. Anne also became ever more reliant on the advice of Harley, who, convinced that the duumvirate's policy of appeasing the Whig Junto was unnecessary, had set himself up as alternative source of advice to a sympathetic Queen.

Following his victory at Ramillies, Marlborough returned to England and the acclamation of Parliament; his titles and estates were made perpetual upon his heirs, male or female, in order that "the memory of these deeds should never lack one of his name to bear it". However, the Allied successes were followed in 1707 with a resurgence in French arms in all fronts of the war, and a return to political squabbling and indecision within the Grand Alliance. The Great Northern War also threatened dire consequences. The French had hoped to entice King Charles XII of Sweden to attack the Empire regarding grievances over the Polish Succession. In a pre-campaign visit to the King's headquarters at Altranstädt, Marlborough's diplomacy helped placate Charles and prevent his interference regarding the Spanish Succession. Following the 1706 Treaty of Altranstädt, Tsar Peter the Great of Russia unsuccessfully offered the yet to be conquered Polish crown to Marlborough, among other candidates.

In Altranstädt, Marlborough reportedly approached Carl Piper, the most favoured of the King's advisers. Allegedly, he offered Piper a pension in exchange for advising Charles XII to launch an invasion of Russia, as this would distract Charles from interfering in the War of the Spanish Succession. Carl Piper was accused of having accepted Marlborough's bribe, advising Charles to invade Russia. Carl Piper denied having accepted Marlborough's offer, but he did admit that Marlborough provided his wife, Christina Piper with a pair of valuable earrings which she accepted, and it was the habit of Carl to personally refuse bribes but allow his wife to accept them and then follow her advice.

Nevertheless, major setbacks in Spain at Almansa and along the Rhine in Southern Germany, had caused Marlborough great anxiety. Prince Eugene's retreat from Toulon (Marlborough's major goal for 1707) ended any lingering hopes of a war-winning blow that year.

Marlborough returned from these tribulations to a political storm as the Ministry's critics turned to attack the overall conduct of the war. The Duke and Godolphin had initially agreed to explore a "moderate scheme" with Harley and reconstruct the government, but they were incensed when Harley privately criticised the management of the war in Spain to the Queen, and his associate Henry St John, the Secretary at War, raised the issue in Parliament. Convinced of Harley's caballing, the duumvirs threatened the Queen with resignation unless she dismissed him. Anne fought stubbornly to keep her favourite minister, but when the Duke of Somerset and the Earl of Pembroke refused to act without "the General nor the Treasurer", Harley resigned: Henry Boyle replaced him as Secretary of State, and his fellow Whig, Robert Walpole, replaced St John as Secretary at War. The struggle had given Marlborough a final lease of power but it was a Whig victory, and he had to a large extent lost his hold on the Queen.

Oudenaarde and Malplaquet

The military setbacks of 1707 continued through the opening months of 1708, with the defection of Bruges and Ghent to the French. Marlborough remained despondent about the general situation, but his optimism received a major boost with the arrival in theatre of Prince Eugene, his co-commander at Blenheim. Heartened by the Prince's robust confidence, Marlborough set about to regain the strategic initiative. After a forced march, the Allies crossed the river Schelde at Oudenaarde just as the French army, under Marshal Vendôme and the duc de Burgundy, was crossing farther north with the intent of besieging the place. Marlborough – with renewed self-assurance – moved decisively to engage them. His subsequent victory at the Battle of Oudenaarde on 11 July 1708 demoralised the French army in Flanders; his eye for ground, his sense of timing and his keen knowledge of the enemy were again amply demonstrated. The success, aided by the dissension of the two French commanders, restored the strategic initiative to the Allies, who now opted to besiege Lille, the strongest fortress in Europe. While the Duke commanded the covering force, Eugene oversaw the siege of the town, which surrendered on 22 October; however, it was not until 10 December that the resolute Boufflers yielded the citadel. Yet for all the difficulties of the winter siege, the campaign of 1708 had been a remarkable success, requiring superior logistical skill and organisation. The Allies re-took Brugge and Gent, and the French were driven out of almost all the Spanish Netherlands: "He who has not seen this", wrote Eugene, "has seen nothing".

While Marlborough achieved honours on the battlefield, the Whigs, now in the ascendancy, drove the remaining Tories from the Cabinet. Marlborough and Godolphin, now distanced from Anne, would henceforth have to conform to the decisions of a Whig ministry, while the Tories, sullen and vengeful, looked forward to their former leaders' downfall. To compound his troubles, the Duchess, spurred on by her hatred of Harley and Abigail, had finally driven the Queen to distraction and wrecked what was left of their friendship. Sarah was retained in her court position out of necessity, as the price to be paid to keep her victorious husband at the head of the army.

After the recent defeats and one of the worst winters in modern history, France was on the brink of collapse. However, Allied demands at the peace talks in The Hague in April 1709 (principally concerning Article 37 that bound Louis XIV to hand over Spain within two months or face the renewal of the war), were rejected by the French in June. The Whigs, the Dutch, Marlborough and Eugene failed for personal and political reasons to secure a favourable peace, adhering to the uncompromising slogan "No peace without Spain" without any clear knowledge of how to accomplish it. All the while Harley, maintained up the backstairs by Abigail, rallied the moderates to his side, ready to play an ambitious and powerful middle part.

Marlborough returned to campaigning in the Low Countries in June 1709. After outwitting Marshal Villars to take the town of Tournai on 3 September (a major and bloody operation), the Allies turned their attention upon Mons, determined to maintain the ceaseless pressure on the French. With direct orders from the increasingly desperate Louis XIV to save the city, Villars advanced on the tiny village of Malplaquet on 9 September 1709 and entrenched his position. Two days later the opposing forces clashed in battle. On the Allied left flank the Prince of Orange led his Dutch infantry in desperate charges only to have it cut to pieces. On the other flank, Eugene attacked and suffered almost as severely. Nevertheless, sustained pressure on his extremities forced Villars to weaken his centre, enabling Marlborough to break through and claim victory. Yet the cost was high: the allied casualty figures were approximately double that of the enemy (sources vary), leading Marlborough to admit – "The French have defended themselves better in this action than in any battle I've seen". A rumour among the French about Marlborough's death in this battle lead to the burlesque lament "Marlbrough s'en va-t-en guerre", (Marlborough has left for the war). The Duke proceeded to take Mons on 20 October, but on his return to England his enemies used the Malplaquet casualty figures to sully his reputation. Harley, now master of the Tory party, did all he could to persuade his colleagues that the pro-war Whigs – and by their apparent concord with Whig policy, Marlborough and Godolphin – were bent on leading the country to ruin.

Endgame

The Allies had confidently expected that victory in a major set-piece battle would compel Louis XIV to accept peace on Allied terms, but after Malplaquet (the bloodiest battle of the war), that strategy had lost its validity: Villars had only to avoid defeat for a compromise peace settlement to become inevitable. In March 1710, fresh peace talks re-opened at Geertruidenberg, but again Louis XIV would not concede Whig demands to force his grandson, Philip V, from Spain. Publicly Marlborough toed the government line, but privately he had real doubts about pressing the French into accepting such a dishonourable course.

Although the Duke was only an observer at Geertruidenberg, the failed negotiations gave credence to his detractors that he was deliberately prolonging the war for his own profit. Yet it was with reluctance that he returned to campaigning in the spring, capturing Douai in June, before taking Béthune, and Saint-Venant, followed in November by Aire-sur-la-Lys. Nevertheless, support for the pro-war policy of the Whigs had, by this time, ebbed away. The Cabinet had long lacked cohesion and mutual trust (particularly following the Sacheverell affair) when in the summer the plan to break it up, prepared by Harley, was brought into action by the Queen. Sunderland was dismissed in June, followed by Godolphin (who had refused to sever his ties with Sarah) in August. Others followed. The result of the general election in October was a Tory landslide and a victory for the peace policy. Marlborough remained at the head of the army, however. The defeated Junto, the Dutch, Eugene and the Emperor, implored him to stand by the common cause, while the new ministers, knowing they had to fight another campaign, required him to maintain the pressure on the enemy until they had made their own arrangements for the peace.

The Duke, "much thinner and greatly altered", returned to England in November. His relationship with Anne had suffered further setbacks in recent months (she had refused to grant him his requested appointment of Captain-General for life, and had interfered in military appointments). The damage done to Marlborough's general standing was substantial because it was so visible. For now, though, the central issue was the Duchess whose growing resentment of Harley and Abigail had finally persuaded the Queen to be rid of her. Marlborough visited Anne on 17 January 1711 (O.S.) in a last attempt to save his wife, but she was not to be swayed, and demanded Sarah give up her Gold Key (the symbol of her office) within two days, warning, "I will talk of no other business till I have the key."

Notwithstanding all this turmoil – and his declining health – Marlborough returned to The Hague in late February to prepare for what was to be his last campaign, and one of his greatest. Once again Marlborough and Villars formed against each other in line of battle, this time along the Avesnes-le-Comte–Arras sector of the Lines of Ne Plus Ultra. Expecting another onslaught on the scale of Malplaquet, the allied generals surmised that their commander, distressed from domestic turmoil, was leading them to an appalling slaughter. By an exercise of brilliant psychological deception, and a secretive night march covering nearly 40 miles in 18 hours, the Allies penetrated the allegedly impregnable lines without losing a single man; Marlborough was now in position to besiege the fortress of Bouchain. Villars, deceived and outmanoeuvred, was helpless to intervene, compelling the fortress's unconditional surrender on 12 September. Chandler writes – "The pure military artistry with which he repeatedly deceived Villars during the first part of the campaign has few equals in the annals of military history ... the subsequent siege of Bouchain with all its technical complexities, was an equally fine demonstration of martial superiority".

For Marlborough, though, time had run out. His strategic gains in 1711 made it virtually certain that the Allies would march on Paris the following year, but Harley had no intention of letting the war progress that far and risk jeopardising the favourable terms secured from the secret Anglo-French talks (based on the idea that Philip V would remain on the Spanish throne) that had proceeded throughout the year. Marlborough had long had doubts about the Whig policy of "No Peace Without Spain", but he was reluctant to abandon his allies (including the Elector of Hanover, Anne's heir presumptive), and sided with the Whigs in opposing the peace preliminaries. Personal entreaties from the Queen (who had long tired of the war), failed to persuade the Duke. The Elector made it clear that he too was against the proposals, and publicly sided with the Whigs. Nevertheless, Anne remained resolute, and on 7 December 1711 (O.S.) she was able to announce that – "notwithstanding those who delight in the arts of war" – a sneer towards Marlborough – "both time and place are appointed for opening the treaty of a general peace".

Dismissal
To prevent the serious renewal of warfare in the spring, it was considered essential to replace Marlborough with a general more in touch with the Queen's ministers and less in touch with their allies. To do this, Harley (newly created Earl of Oxford) and St John first needed to bring charges of corruption against the Duke, completing the anti-Whig, anti-war picture that Jonathan Swift was already presenting to a credulous public through his pamphleteering, notably in his Conduct of the Allies (1711).

Two main charges were brought to the House of Commons against Marlborough: first, an assertion that over nine years he had illegally received more than £63,000 from the bread and transport contractors in the Netherlands; second, that he had taken 2.5% from the pay of the foreign troops in English pay, amounting to £280,000. Despite Marlborough's refutations (claiming ancient precedent for the first allegation, and, for the second, producing a warrant signed by the Queen in 1702 authorising him to make the deductions in lieu of secret-service money for the war), the findings were enough for Harley to persuade the Queen to release her Captain-General. On 29 December 1711 (O.S.), before the charges had been examined, Anne, who owed to him the success and glory of her reign, sent her letter of dismissal: "I am sorry for your own sake the reasons are become so public which makes it necessary for me to let you know you have render'd it impracticable for you to continue yet longer in my service". The Tory-dominated Parliament concluded by a substantial majority that "the taking of several sums of money annually by the Duke of Marlborough from the contractor for foraging the bread and wagons ... was unwarrantable and illegal", and that the 2.5% deducted from the pay of foreign troops "is public money and ought to be accounted for". When his successor, the Duke of Ormonde, left London for The Hague to take command of British forces he went, noted Bishop Burnet, with "the same allowances that had been lately voted criminal in the Duke of Marlborough".

The Allies were stunned by Marlborough's dismissal. The French, however, rejoiced at the removal of the main obstacle to the Anglo-French talks. Oxford (i.e. Harley) and St John had no intention of letting Britain's new Captain-General undertake any action, and issued Ormonde his "restraining orders" in May, forbidding him to use British troops in action against the French – an infamous step that ultimately ruined Eugene's campaign in Flanders. Marlborough continued to make his views known, but he was in trouble: attacked by his enemies and the government press; with his fortune in peril and Blenheim Palace still unfinished and running out of money; and with England split between Hanoverian and Jacobite factions, Marlborough thought it wise to leave the country. After attending Godolphin's funeral on 7 October (O.S.), he went into voluntary exile to the Continent on 1 December 1712 (O.S.).

Later years and death

Return to favour

Marlborough was welcomed and fêted by the people and courts of Europe, where he was not only respected as a great general but also as a prince of the Holy Roman Empire. Sarah joined him in February 1713, and was delighted when on reaching Frankfurt in the middle of May to see that the troops under Eugene's command paid her lord "all the respects as if he had been at his old post".

Throughout his travels Marlborough remained in close contact with the Electoral court of Hanover, determined to ensure a bloodless Hanoverian succession on Anne's death. He also maintained correspondence with the Jacobites. The spirit of the age saw little wrong in Marlborough's continuing friendship with his nephew, the Duke of Berwick, James II's illegitimate son with Arabella. But these assurances against a Jacobite restoration (which he had been taking out since the early years of William III, no matter how insincere), stirred Hanoverian suspicions, and perhaps prevented him from holding the first place in the counsels of the future George I.

The representatives of France, Great Britain, and the Dutch Republic signed the Treaty of Utrecht on 11 April 1713 (N.S.) – the Emperor and his German allies, including the Elector of Hanover, continued with the war before finally accepting the general settlement the following year. The Treaty marked Britain's emergence as a great power. Domestically, however, the country remained divided between Whig and Tory, Jacobite and Hanoverian factions. By now Oxford and St John (Viscount Bolingbroke since 1712) – absorbed entirely by their mutual enmity and political squabbling – had effectively wrecked the Tory administration. Marlborough had been kept well informed of events while in exile and had remained a powerful figure on the political scene, not least because of the personal attachment the Queen still retained for him. After the death of his daughter Elizabeth from smallpox in March 1714, Marlborough contacted the Queen. Although the contents of the letter are unknown, it is possible that Anne may have summoned him home. Either way, it seems that an agreement was reached to reinstate the Duke in his former offices.

Oxford's period of predominance was now at an end, and Anne turned to Bolingbroke and Marlborough to assume the reins of government and ensure a smooth succession. But beneath the weight of hostility the Queen's health, already fragile, rapidly deteriorated, and on 1 August 1714 (O.S.) – the day the Marlboroughs returned to England – she died. The Privy Council immediately proclaimed the Elector of Hanover King George I of Great Britain. The Jacobites had proved incapable of action; what Daniel Defoe called the "solidity of the constitution" had triumphed, and the regents chosen by George prepared for his arrival.

Death 
The Duke's return to favour under the House of Hanover enabled him to preside over the defeat of the 1715 Jacobite rising from London (although it was his former assistant, Cadogan, who directed the operations). But his health was fading, and on 28 May 1716 (O.S.), shortly after the death of his daughter Anne, Countess of Sunderland, he suffered a paralytic stroke at Holywell House. This was followed by another, more serious stroke in November, this time at a house on the Blenheim estate. The Duke recovered somewhat, his speech had become mildly impaired, but it was not severe and continued to improve over time and his mind remained as sharp and clear as ever. He recovered enough to ride out to watch the builders at work on Blenheim Palace and attend the Lords to vote for Oxford's impeachment.

In 1719 the Duke and Duchess were able to move into the east wing of the unfinished palace, but Marlborough had only three years to enjoy it. While living at Windsor Lodge he suffered another stroke in June 1722, not long after his 72nd birthday. Finally, at 4 a.m on 16 June (O.S.), in the presence of his wife and two surviving daughters Henrietta Godolphin and Mary Montagu, the 1st Duke of Marlborough died. He was initially buried on 9 August (O.S.) in the vault at the east end of Henry VII's chapel in Westminster Abbey, but following instructions left by Sarah, who died in 1744,  Marlborough was moved to be by her side lying in the vault beneath the chapel at Blenheim.

Legacy

Assessment 
Historian John H. Lavalle argues that:
Marlborough's place as one of the finest soldiers Britain ever produced is well deserved. He possessed the personal courage, imagination, common sense, self-control, and quick wits that mark the best battlefield commanders. He had an unerring ability to sense an enemy's weaknesses and the ability to use stratagems to throw his enemy off balance.... It was in the realm of strategy, however, where Marlborough really shone. As commander-in-chief of a coalition army, he had the ability to tolerate politicians, allies, and fools gladly. He also saw the potential of the recently introduced combination of flintlock and socket bayonet to restore the offensive...to warfare in an age when extensive fortifications, magazines, and the defensive dominated military thinking. Marlborough's attention to logistics allowed him to break free of the bonds of the magazine system and ensured that his soldiers were fed, clothed, and paid, earning him the loyalty of his troops and the nickname "Corporal John".

Marlborough was equally adept at both battle and siege. Robert Parker writes:
in the ten campaigns he made against [the French]; during all which time it cannot be said that he ever slipped an opportunity of fighting, when there was any probability of coming at his enemy: and upon all occasions he concerted matters with so much judgement and forecast, that he never fought a battle which he did not gain, nor laid siege to a town which he did not take.

To military historians David Chandler and Richard Holmes, Marlborough is the greatest British commander in history, an assessment that is shared by others, including the Duke of Wellington who could "conceive nothing greater than Marlborough at the head of an English army". However, the 19th century Whig historian, Thomas Macaulay, denigrates Marlborough throughout the pages of his The History of England from the Accession of James the Second who, in the words of historian John Wilson Croker, pursues the Duke with "more than the ferocity, and much less than the sagacity, of a bloodhound". According to historian George Trevelyan, Macaulay "instinctively desired to make Marlborough's genius stand out bright against the background of his villainy". It was in response to Macaulay's History that a descendant, Winston Churchill, wrote his laudatory biography, Marlborough: His Life and Times (4 vol. 1933–1938).

Marlborough was ruthlessly ambitious, relentless in the pursuit of wealth, power and social advancement, earning him a reputation for avarice and miserliness. These traits may have been exaggerated for the purposes of party faction but, notes Trevelyan, nearly all other statesmen of the day were engaged in founding families and amassing estates at the public expense; Marlborough only differed in that he gave the public much more value for their money. In his quest for fame and personal interests he could be unscrupulous, as his desertion of James II testifies. To Macaulay this is regarded as a piece of selfish treachery against his patron; an analysis shared by G. K. Chesterton, a devout Catholic: "Churchill, as if to add something ideal to his imitation of Iscariot, went to James with wanton professions of love and loyalty ... and then calmly handed over the army to the invader. To the finish of this work of art but few could aspire, but in their degree all the politicians of the Revolution were upon this ethical pattern". To Trevelyan, Marlborough's behaviour during the 1688 revolution was a sign of his "devotion to the liberties of England and the Protestant religion". However, his continuing correspondence with Saint-Germain was not noble. Although Marlborough did not wish for a Jacobite restoration his double-dealing ensured that William III and George I would never be fully disposed to trust him.

Marlborough's weakness during Anne's reign lay in the English political scene. His determination to preserve the independence of the Queen's administration from control of party faction initially enjoyed full support, but once royal favour turned elsewhere, the Duke, like his key ally Godolphin, found himself isolated; first becoming little more than a servant of the Whigs, then a victim of the Tories. Nonetheless he has been consistently ranked as one of the greatest military commanders of the modern Era.

Captain-General

On the grand strategic level Marlborough had a rare grasp of the broad issues involved, and was able from the start of the Spanish Succession war to see the conflict in its entirety. He was one of the few influences working towards genuine unity within the Grand Alliance, but the extension of the war aims to include the replacement of Philip V as King of Spain was a fatal mistake. Marlborough stands accused – possibly for political and diplomatic reasons – of not pressing his private doubts about reinforcing failure. Spain proved a continuous drain of men and resources, and ultimately hampered his chances of complete success in Flanders, the war's main theatre. The Allies did come close to a complete victory on several occasions, but the increasingly severe conditions imposed upon Louis XIV forestalled an early end to hostilities. Although the Duke lost his political influence in the latter stages of the war he still possessed vast prestige abroad, yet his failure to communicate his innermost convictions to his allies or political masters means he must bear some responsibility for the continuance of the war beyond its logical conclusion.

As a commander Marlborough preferred battle over slow moving siege warfare. Aided by an expert staff (particularly his carefully selected aides-de-camp such as Cadogan), as well as enjoying a close personal relationship with the talented Imperial commander, Prince Eugene, Marlborough proved far-sighted, often far ahead of his contemporaries in his conceptions, and was a master at assessing his enemy's characteristics in battle. Marlborough was more likely to manoeuvre than his opponents, and was better at maintaining operational tempo at critical times, yet the Duke qualifies more as a great practitioner within the constraints of early 18th century warfare, rather than as a great innovator who radically redefined military theory. Nevertheless, his predilection for fire, movement, and co-ordinated all-arms attacks, lay at the root of his great battlefield successes. However, Sicco van Goslinga, one of the Dutch deputies who worked very close with Marlborough also noted a number of flaws. Although generally positive about Marlborough, he wrote: "He [Marlborough] was sometimes indecisive, especially on the eve of some great undertaking, shrank from difficulties, and sometimes allowed himself to be beaten down by adversity. Maybe that's because he doesn't handle fatigue very well. He knows little about military discipline and gives too much freedom to the soldiers, causing them to commit horrible excesses."

Marlborough was also a good administrator; his attention to detail meant his troops rarely went short of supply – when his army arrived at its destination it was intact and in a fit state to fight. This concern for the welfare of the common soldier together with his ability to inspire trust and confidence, and his willingness to share the dangers of battle, often earned him adulation from his men – "The known world could not produce a man of more humanity", observed Corporal Matthew Bishop. It was this range of abilities that makes Marlborough outstanding. Even his old adversaries recognised the Duke's qualities. In his Letters on the Study of History (1752), Bolingbroke declared – "I take with pleasure this opportunity of doing justice to that great man ... [whose memory] as the greatest general, and as the greatest minister that our country, or perhaps any other has produced, I honour". His success was made possible because of his enormous reserves of stamina, willpower and self-discipline; his ability to hold together the Alliance against France, made possible by his victories, can hardly be overestimated.

Family tree

Arms

Notes

References

Sources
 
 
 
 
 
 
 
 
 
 
  6 volumes.
 
 
 
 
 
 
 
 
 
 
 
 
 
 
 
 
 
 
 
 
 
 
 
 
 
 
 
 
 
  3 volumes.
  pedigree of Drake.

Further reading
 C.T. Atkinson, ‘’Marlborough and the British Army’’ (London: G.P. Putnam, 1924).
 John B. Hattendorf, A.J. Veenendaal, and Rolof van Hövell tot Westerflier, eds., ‘’Marlborough: Soldier and Diplomat’’ Protagonists in International Perspective. (Rotterdam: Karwansaray Publishing, 2012).
 

|-

|-

|-

|-

|-

|-

|-

|-

|-

|-

1650 births
1722 deaths
1st The Royal Dragoons officers
British army commanders in the War of the Spanish Succession
British Army generals
British Life Guards officers
British military personnel of the Nine Years' War
101
Princes of the Holy Roman Empire
Prisoners in the Tower of London
English art collectors
Grenadier Guards officers
Governors of the Hudson's Bay Company
Garter Knights appointed by Anne
Lord-Lieutenants of Oxfordshire
Members of the Privy Council of England
People educated at St Paul's School, London
People expelled from the Privy Council of England
Pages of Honour
People from Old Windsor
Royal Fusiliers officers
Soldiers of the Tangier Garrison
South Wales Borderers officers
John Churchill, 1st Duke of Marlborough
People of the Glorious Revolution
Churchill
Ambassadors of Great Britain to Sweden
Ambassadors of England to the Netherlands
17th-century diplomats
17th-century Scottish peers
Peers of Scotland created by Charles II
Peers of England created by James II
Military personnel from Devon
Members of Parliament for the Isle of Wight